Candacy Atkins (born 13 February 1984) is a Guyanese cricketer who has represented the West Indies and the United States, playing primarily as a right-arm medium bowler. She represented the West Indies in one Test match and 11 One Day Internationals in 2003 and 2004, and played domestic cricket for Guyana between 2002 and 2005. In March 2019, she was named in the United States team for the 2019 ICC Women's Qualifier Americas tournament against Canada. She made her WT20I debut for the United States against Canada in the Americas Qualifier on 19 May 2019.

In February 2021, she was named in the Women's National Training Group by the USA Cricket Women's National Selectors ahead of the 2021 Women's Cricket World Cup Qualifier and the 2021 ICC Women's T20 World Cup Americas Qualifier tournaments.

References

External links

1984 births
Living people
People from New Amsterdam, Guyana
Guyanese emigrants to the United States
American sportspeople of Guyanese descent
West Indian women cricketers
Guyanese women cricketers
West Indies women Test cricketers
West Indies women One Day International cricketers
American women cricketers
United States women Twenty20 International cricketers
Dual international cricketers
21st-century American women